Ashutosh Ashokrao Kale is Chairman of Shri Saibaba Sansthan Trust, Shirdi and a member of the Maharashtra Legislative Assembly from the Kopargaon constituency in Maharashtra, India. He is Chairman of the Karmaveer Shankarrao Kale Co-operative sugar factory.

Early life and family 
Ashutosh Kale was born to ex. MLA Ashokrao Kale and Mrs. Pushpatai Kale in Mahegaon Deshmukh, Tal: Kopargaon, Maharashtra on 4 August 1985. Grandson of ex. MP Shankarrao Kale. He completed his schooling from Gautam Public School Kolpewadi, Tal: Kopargaon & Sanjeevan Vidyalaya Pachagani. He graduated in "Bachelor of Engineering" studies from University of Pune and Master of Science from Northeastern University, Boston. Ashutosh Kale is married to Mrs. Chaitali Ghule – Kale and has a son Ayansh.

Political career 
Ashutosh Kale started his social activity with raising voice for farmers rights in Kopargaon since 2013. He is fighting for various issues of farmers and citizens of Kopargaon.
In October 2019, he contested and won the seat from the Kopargaon (Vidhan Sabha constituency) during the 2019 Maharashtra Legislative Assembly election and also became the third generation member of the Kale family to win the election. Due to his dedication to his work he got elected as a Chairman of Shri Saibaba Sansthan Trust, Shirdi and Chairman of North region of Rayat Shikshan Sanstha. 

As a chairman of Karmaveer Shankarrao Kale Co-operative sugar factory, Kale claimed credit for making the factory loss-free within 5 years.

See also
 Shankarrao Kale

References

External links
 
 Karmaveer Shankarrao Kale Sahakari Sakhar Karkhana

1985 births
Living people
Marathi people
Nationalist Congress Party politicians from Maharashtra
People from Ahmednagar district
Savitribai Phule Pune University alumni
Northeastern University alumni